The Ministry of Islamic Affairs, Dawah, and Guidance, at times shortened to Ministry of Islamic Affairs (MOIA), is a government ministry in Saudi Arabia that is responsible for overseeing affairs pertaining to Islam as well as maintaining and regulating all mosques across the country. Established in 1993, it also supervises the King Fahd Complex for the Printing of the Holy Qur'an in Medina. 

The ministry's responsibilities include increasing the awareness of the good practice of Islam. The current minister, Abdullatif Al-Sheikh, was appointed in June 2018. The ministry is also responsible for supporting the non-profit sector as it aims at increasing the sector's contribution to the gross domestic product from 0.3% to 0.6%.

MOIA has a wide range of responsibilities, including overseeing mosques and Islamic centers, managing religious publications and media, supporting Islamic education, and promoting interfaith dialogue.

International efforts 
In 2019,  the ministry implemented a project in 35 countries that aims at promoting the values of moderation and tolerance. This project includes delivering speeches, organizing scientific events and giving training courses.

References

External links 
Official website

Islamic
Government agencies established in 1993
1993 establishments in Saudi Arabia
Saudi